Idaho Legislative District 10 is one of 35 districts of the Idaho Legislature. It is currently represented by Jim Rice, Republican  of Caldwell, Jarom Wagoner, Republican of Caldwell, and Greg Chaney, Republican of Caldwell.

District profile (1992–2002) 
From 1992 to 2002, District 10 consisted of a portion of Canyon County.

District profile (2002–2012) 
From 2002 to 2012, District 10 consisted of a portion of Canyon County.

District profile (2012–2022) 
District 10 currently consists of a portion of Canyon County, Idaho.

District profile (2022–) 
In December 2022, District 10 will consist of a portion of Canyon and Ada Counties.

See also

 List of Idaho Senators
 List of Idaho State Representatives

References

External links
 District 10 Map (Adopted 2011)
Idaho Legislative District Map (with members)
Idaho Legislature (official site)

10
Canyon County, Idaho